Boeta may refer to:

People
 Boeta Chamberlain (born 1999), South African rugby union player
 Boeta Dippenaar, South African cricket player
 Boeta Hamman (born 1997), South African rugby union player

Other
 Imma boeta, moth in the family Immidae